Obsesión is a Mexican telenovela produced by Televisa for Telesistema Mexicano in 1967.

Cast 
Ofelia Guilmáin
Virginia Gutiérrez
Andrea Palma
María Idalia

References

External links 

Mexican telenovelas
1967 telenovelas
Televisa telenovelas
Spanish-language telenovelas
1967 Mexican television series debuts
1967 Mexican television series endings